Pier Giorgio Frassati (6 April 1901 – 4 July 1925) was an Italian Catholic activist and a member from the Third Order of Saint Dominic. He was dedicated to social justice issues and joined several charitable organizations, including Catholic Action and the Society of Saint Vincent de Paul, to better aid the poor and less fortunate living in his hometown of Turin; he put his own pious beliefs into practice to cater to their needs and was best known for his devotion and amiable character.

Frassati was an avid mountaineer who often climbed with his friends; he was an able swimmer and athlete best known for engaging in such social activities with a range of like-minded friends. His charitable outreach towards others knew no bounds for he identified with and aided the poor and ill from his childhood. His social status granted him greater freedom in aiding others who needed it most.

His cause for canonization opened in 1932 after the Turin poor made several pleas for such a cause to open Pope Pius XII suspended the cause in 1941 due to a range of allegations later proven to be false, which allowed for the cause to resume. Pope John Paul II beatified Frassati in May 1990 and dubbed him the "Man of the Eight Beatitudes".

Life
Pier Giorgio Frassati was born on 6 April 1901 – Holy Saturday – to Alfredo Frassati (28 September 1868 – 21 May 1961; an agnostic who owned the noted liberal newspaper La Stampa) and Adélaïde Ametis (17 February 1877 – 18 June 1949) who was a noted painter. His only sibling – a sister – was Luciana Gawronska (18 August 1902 – 7 October 2007). His father was also active in national politics and he served in the Italian Senate before later becoming the Italian ambassador to the German nation. His parents married on 5 September 1898. His artist mother had works exhibited at an event in Venice that saw King Victor Emmanuel III purchase some of her works. His paternal grandparents were Pietro Frassati and Giuseppina Coda Canati.

Frassati's inclinations to help others had manifested in his childhood. There was one occasion as a child where he answered the door to find a mother begging with her son who was shoeless. His response was to take off his own shoes and give them to the child. In 1909 his father refused to help a man who came to their door because he was drunk. The sobbing Frassati told his mother of this and she instructed him to find the man and bring him to the home for something to eat. His first confession was heard at the church of Corpus Christi on 20 June 1910, and he received his First Communion on 19 June 1911; he received his Confirmation in his parish church on 10 June 1915.

Frassati was known as the "Terror" due to his fondness for practical jokes though they were in good taste.

He was an average student in school, though Frassati was known among his peers for his intelligence and more so for his devotion. He failed his exams in 1913 so was sent for private studies at a school run by the Jesuits.

Frassati was dedicated to works of social action that would unite people together in fellowship as a means of combating inequalities. He was an opponent of fascism and did not support the regime of Benito Mussolini. He was once arrested in Rome while protesting alongside the 1921 Young Catholic Workers Congress. He was involved with student groups as well as the Apostolato di preghiera and Catholic Action (joined in 1919) to which he dedicated himself.

Frassati also became a professed member of the Third Order of Saint Dominic on 28 May 1922 to imitate the example of Dominic of Osma, in which he assumed the religious name of "Girolamo" in honor of Girolamo Savonarola. He was also devoted to the teachings of Thomas Aquinas and Catherine of Siena. The teachings of Paul the Apostle also inspired him and that saint is mentioned in a range of Frassati's letters.

He often said: "Charity is not enough; we need social reform".  He helped establish a newspaper entitled Momento whose principles were based on Pope Leo XIII's Rerum novarum. He joined the Saint Vincent de Paul group in 1918 and spent much of his time helping the poor and less fortunate. In 1918 he began his studies in engineering so he could become a mining engineer since he wanted to do this in order "to serve Christ better among the miners". Upon his graduation his father offered him either a car or a sizable fund though he chose the latter so he could give it to the poor rather than use it for himself. He also provided a bed for a tuberculosis sufferer on one occasion as well as supporting the three children of an ill widow and finding a place for an evicted woman. During the course of his studies he found himself attracted to a girl due to her candor and goodness which impressed him. He never dated her since he was apprehensive of whether or not his parents would approve of her. This prompted him to renounce such an undertaking for a relationship as he confided to his sister.

His talents seemed to be limitless for he was an avid mountaineer and athlete who could swim well and could even recite Dante passages with relative ease. Frassati was a member of the Club Alpino Italiano and climbed mountains such as the Grand Tournalin and Monte Viso. He also frequented theatres and museums with friends whenever he had the chance. But, he only saw films at the cinema after learning of that film's moral qualities, since he disliked those things of a vulgar and impure nature. He did learn how to dance, though never liked it so much as he often noted. He also knew German as well as French.

On 30 June 1925, while boating with two friends on the Po River, he began to complain of sharp pains in his back muscles. On July 1, he returned home with a severe headache and a fever. On the very same day, his maternal grandmother passed away. Because of his sincere humility, he deflected attention from himself, preferring that his family mourn for his grandmother. On 2 July a doctor was summoned and asked the prone Frassati to get up from lying down. Frassati could not move and said: "I can't!" Soon a diagnosis was made that he had poliomyelitis which exacerbated his fatigue. This fatigue prompted him to ask for a morphine shot so he could sleep easier. However, the doctor and his mother believed the shot to be imprudent, and Frassati relented.

He gave his final instructions to his sister as his condition worsened and it became apparent that he would soon die. His condition grew to the breaking point at 3:00 am on 4 July in which a priest was summoned to give him the Last Rites. He was near death at 4:00 pm with his mother holding him in her arms. His final words were: "May I breathe forth my soul in peace with you". Frassati died on 4 July 1925 due to polio at 7:00 pm. His parents expected Turin's elite and political figures to come to offer their condolences and attend the funeral and expected to find many of his friends there as well. All were surprised to find the streets lined with thousands of mourners as the cortege passed out of the reverence felt for him among the people he had helped. He was buried in the Frassati plot at the Pollone Cimitero. His remains were later transferred to the Turin Cathedral in 1981 and, upon later inspection, were found to be incorrupt.

Beatification

The poor of Turin began to petition the Archbishop of Turin to begin the cause for Frassati's canonization. The cause commenced on 2 July 1932 for a thorough examination of Frassati's life in an informative process that later concluded on 23 October 1935 after collecting a range of documentation and witness testimonies (Cardinal Maurilio Fossati oversaw this process in his role as archbishop). Frassati's writings were also collected for examination ensure no doctrinal breaches were present since that would impede the cause to a significant degree; theologians cleared them on 21 December 1938.

A grave setback to the cause came in 1941 after Pope Pius XII suspended the cause upon the airing of allegations questioning Frassati's morals and claiming that Frassati went to the mountains in mixed and questionable company. His sister - sometime after this - went to Rome to discuss this with Vatican officials to rehabilitate her brother's good name rather than to resume the cause. The allegations were proven to be false and Vatican officials declared that the cause would resume. The formal introduction of the cause came under Pope Paul VI on 12 June 1978 and he became titled as a Servant of God. An apostolic process was later held following this and it concluded later in 1981. The Congregation for the Causes of Saints issued a decree of validation on 12 June 1987 for the previous processes and received the Positio dossier from the postulation later in 1987. Theologians approved its contents on 14 July 1987 as did the members of the C.C.S. later on 28 September 1987. Frassati was proclaimed to be Venerable on 23 October 1987 after Pope John Paul II authorized a decree confirming that Frassati had lived a model Christian life of heroic virtue.

A single miracle - often a healing medicine and science cannot explain - was needed for his beatification. The miracle investigated was the cure of Domenico Sellan (1893 - c. 1968) in late 1933 who suffered from grave tuberculosis. A priest visited him on 28 December 1933 to bring him a relic and picture of Frassati for his intercession. Sellan was healed of the disease and lived for over three more decades in perfect health. The closure of the miracle's investigation allowed for the C.C.S. to validate the process in a 20 February 1989 decree prior to the approval of medical experts on 26 April 1989. Theologians also confirmed the healing was a miracle on 30 June 1989 as did the C.C.S. on 3 October 1989. John Paul II granted final approval to the miracle on 21 December 1989 which also confirmed that Frassati would soon be beatified. John Paul II  beatified Frassati in Saint Peter's Square on 20 May 1990.

The current postulator for this cause is the Jesuit priest Pascual Cebollada Silvestre.

Posthumous recognition
Frassati is the eponym and patron of the Frassati Catholic Academy in Wauconda which is a middle school founded in the Archdiocese of Chicago in 2010 and also the Frassati Catholic High School which opened in August 2013 in Houston. Blessed Pier Giorgio Frassati Catholic School was opened as part of the Toronto Catholic District School Board on 3 September 2013 in the Scarborough area of Toronto in Canada.

Pier Giorgio Frassati is the patron of Bishop McGuinness High School in Oklahoma, and the school awards the "Blessed Pier Giorgio Frassati Award" to its students who have performed a high level of service to others.

Frassati Australia - based in Brisbane - venerates Pier Giorgio Frassati as their patron and as a role model for adolescent men. Frassati Australia engages them in the Catholic faith and encourages them to encounter Christ through living an authentic Catholic life in brotherhood and through charitable outreach. At the present time there are at least three Frassati Houses in Brisbane and around twelve men in these houses.

Christendom College in Front Royal Virginia, a catholic liberal arts college, has hosted the Frassati Invitational rugby tournament annually, since 2016.

Sacred Heart University in Fairfield, Connecticut, has a residence hall named after him, called Pier Giorgio Frassati Hall.

Papal recognition
In 1989 John Paul II visited his tomb and paid honor to him calling him the "Man of the Eight Beatitudes". Pope Benedict XVI called upon adolescents in 2010 to follow the example of Frassati to "... discover that it is worth to commit oneself for God ... to respond to His call in the fundamental decisions" throughout one's life.

Pope Francis venerated Frassati's remains in November 2015 while visiting Turin.

World Youth Day
Frassati's remains have been moved from their resting place in Turin twice, for two occasions of World Youth Day, with one being in Sydney in 2008, and the other in Kraków in 2016.

See also

Luciana Frassati Gawronska – Pier Giorgio's sister

References

External links

 Hagiography Circle
 Saints SQPN
 Saint Kateri Parish
 Blessed Pier Giorgio Frassati
 Santi e Beati
 piergiorgiofrassati.org
 Pier Giorgio Frassati's official website
 Frassati Catholic High School
 
 EWTN

1901 births
1925 deaths
20th-century Italian people
20th-century venerated Christians
Beatifications by Pope John Paul II
Burials at Turin Cathedral
Deaths from polio
Dominican beatified people
Dominican tertiaries
Lay Dominicans
Italian anti-fascists
Italian activists
Italian beatified people
Italian mountain climbers
Religious leaders from Turin
Roman Catholic activists
Venerated Catholics by Pope John Paul II
Venerated Dominicans
Italian anti-capitalists
People from Turin